The 2011 UniCredit Czech Open was a professional tennis tournament played on outdoor red clay courts. It was part of the 2011 ATP Challenger Tour. It took place in Prostějov, Czech Republic between 30 May and 5 June 2011.

ATP entrants

Seeds

 Rankings are as of May 23, 2011.

Other entrants
The following players received wildcards into the singles main draw:
  Lu Yen-hsun
  Tommy Robredo
  Andreas Seppi
  Mikhail Youzhny

The following players received entry from the qualifying draw:
  Roman Jebavý
  Evgeny Korolev
  Adrián Menéndez
  Roman Vögeli

Champions

Singles

 Yuri Schukin def.  Flavio Cipolla, 6–4, 4–6, 6–0

Doubles

 Sergei Bubka /  Adrián Menéndez def.  David Marrero /  Rubén Ramírez Hidalgo, 7–5, 6–2

References
Official website
ITF search
ATP official site

UniCredit Czech Open
Clay court tennis tournaments
Czech Open (tennis)
2011 in Czech tennis
May 2011 sports events in Europe
June 2011 sports events in Europe